Isolepis cernua (basionym Scirpus cernuus) is a species of flowering plant in the sedge family known by the common names low bulrush, slender club-rush, tufted clubrush, and fiberoptic grass. It is widespread, being native to many regions of the world, including parts of Australasia, Eurasia, Africa, and North and South America.

References

External links
Online Field guide to Common Saltmarsh Plants of Queensland
Jepson Manual Treatment
Washington Burke Museum
Flora of North America
Photo gallery

cernua
Cosmopolitan species
Garden plants
Grasses of Asia
Grasses of Africa
Grasses of North America
Grasses of South America
Poales of Australia
Plants described in 1805